Margining risk is a financial risk that future cash flows are smaller than expected due to the payment of margins, i.e. a collateral as deposit from a counterparty to cover some (or all) of its credit risk. It can be seen as a short-term liquidity risk, a quantity called MaR can be used to measure it.

Methodology 
In order to decrease the risk of a counter party to default, a technique called portfolio margining is applied, which simply means that the assets within a portfolio are clustered and sorted by the descending projected net loss, e.g. calculated by a pricing model. One can then determine for which cluster(s) one wants to perform margin calls.

References 

Credit risk